The False Millionaire (Swedish: Falska millionären) is a 1931 French-Swedish comedy film directed by Paul Merzbach and starring Fridolf Rhudin, Zarah Leander and Annalisa Ericson. It was shot at the Råsunda Studios in Stockholm and on location in the city. The film's sets were designed by the art director Vilhelm Bryde and Arne Åkermark. A separate French-language version Mon coeur et ses millions was also produced.

Cast
 Fridolf Rhudin as 	Fridolf F. Johnson
 Zarah Leander as 	Marguerite Lebon
 Ingert Bjuggren as 	Baroness Brita Gyllenblad
 Håkan Westergren as 	Fridolf F. Johnson
 Erik Berglund asPolice officer
 Annalisa Ericson as Anna-Lisa
 Weyler Hildebrand as Weyler
 Olav Riégo as 	Dacapo
 Sture Lagerwall as 	Reporter
 Knut Lambert as 	Baron Gyllenblad
 Emma Meissner as 	Baroness Gyllenblad
 Gösta Lycke as 	Maitre d'
 Helge Andersson as 	Steward 
 Gunnar Björnstrand as 	Member of the choir 
 Tor Borong as 	Constable 
 Josef Brandstedt as 	Trombone player 
 Alice Carlsson as 	Woman on the ship 
 Artur Cederborgh as 	Ship passenger 
 Kotti Chave as 	Ship passenger 
 Eivor Engelbrektsson as 	Young woman outside Grand Hotel 
 Georg Fernqvist as 	Constable 
 Sigge Fürst as 	Policeman 
 Bengt-Olof Granberg as 	Man outside Grand Hotel 
 Karin Granberg as 	Woman on the ship 
 Paul Hagman as 	Maitre d' 
 Carl Harald as 	Constable outside Grand Hotel 
 Sune Holmqvist as 	Singing bellboy 
 Per Hugo Jacobsson as 	Man outside Grand Hotel 
 Ludde Juberg as 	Barber 
 Axel Lagerberg as 	Police interrogating Fridolf 
 Yngve Nyqvist as 	Constable 
 Dagmar Olsson as 	Woman outside Grand Hotel 
 Johan Petersson as Captain 
 Harald Wehlnor as	Constable outside Grand Hotel

References

Bibliography 
 Wallengren, Ann-Kristin.  Welcome Home Mr Swanson: Swedish Emigrants and Swedishness on Film. Nordic Academic Press, 2014.

External links 
 

1931 films
French comedy films
Swedish comedy films
1931 comedy films
1930s Swedish-language films
Films directed by Paul Merzbach
Swedish black-and-white films
1930s Swedish films
1930s French films